Sun Park (born 3 January 1981) is a Korean Australian singer, actress, entertainer and former member of the children's entertainment group Hi-5 as well as the television series of the same name.

Career
Park graduated from the University of Texas at Austin with a Bachelor of Business Administration, Finance. She later appeared in the Brisbane and Sydney seasons of Mamma Mia!.  Before her stint with Hi-5, she toured with the live act BPM - Beats Per Minute that fused funk, rock, jazz and hip hop music, and worked with the Australian band Rogue Traders, alongside the now very successful Natalie Bassingthwaighte.

In 2006, she was hired as a temporary replacement for entertainer Kathleen de Leon Jones in the children's entertainment group Hi-5, and was announced as a permanent replacement in 2007 when de Leon Jones confirmed she would not be returning to the group. In December 2008, Park announced that she would be leaving Hi-5 after less than three years with the group in order to concentrate on settling down and starting a family. She also expressed that she felt she was only ever meant to be a temporary replacement for Kathleen. Park's final performance with the group was at the 2008 Carols by Candlelight.

Personal life
Park told the media in 2008 that she was going to settle down and focus on starting a family after finishing her work with Australian children's entertainment group Hi-5. She announced plans to marry in 2009 and that year, she married business development worker Nathan Pezzimenti.

Theatre credits

Filmography

References

1981 births
Living people
Australian children's musicians
Australian female dancers
South Korean emigrants to Australia
Australian women pop singers
Australian television actresses
Australian film actresses
Australian people of Korean descent
South Korean female dancers
South Korean women pop singers
South Korean television actresses
South Korean film actresses
South Korean expatriates in the United States
Australian expatriates in the United States
21st-century Australian actresses
21st-century Australian dancers
21st-century Australian singers
21st-century South Korean actresses
21st-century South Korean singers
21st-century Australian women singers
Australian actresses of Asian descent